Tim Bowles may refer to:

 Tim Bowles (attorney), American attorney
 Tim Bowles (politician), British politician
 Timothy Bowles (American politician), former state legislator from Connecticut's 42nd House of Representatives district